Minah Ogbenyealu Bird, (also known as Mynah Bird, 11 March 1950 – July 1995)  was a Nigerian model and actress active in the United Kingdom in the 1970s.

Biography 
Bird hailed from Aba in Nigeria and was educated in both Nigeria and Finland.

After appearing in such films as Up Pompeii (1971), Four Dimensions of Greta (1972), The Love Box (1972), Layout for 5 Models (1972), Percy's Progress (1974), Vampira (1974), Alfie Darling (1976), The Stud (1978), The London Connection (1979) and A Nightingale Sang in Berkeley Square (1979). Described as the "only major black starlet in British sex films", she vanished from public view from the late 1970s and was found dead in her London council flat, a few weeks after suffering an apparent heart attack in 1995.

Bird was listed as one of the "top black fashion models who paved the way for black women in fashion" alongside Iman and Grace Jones.

She appeared on the cover of Oz magazine in November 1970. She is credited with a series in the Sunday Mirror in the mid 70s that birthed the trend of Kiss N Tell stories in newspapers.

Filmography

References

External links 

1950 births
1995 deaths
20th-century Nigerian actresses
Black British actresses
Nigerian emigrants to the United Kingdom
British female models
Nigerian female models
Igbo female models
Igbo actresses